Hampton Court House is a Grade II listed 18th-century building on the edge of Bushy Park in the London Borough of Richmond upon Thames. George Montagu-Dunk, 2nd Earl of Halifax, built the house in 1757. The estate is Grade II* listed on the Register of Historic Parks and Gardens.

Hampton Court House houses a co-educational private school and also hosts events such as weddings and the filming of movies.

The school
Hampton Court House School, or HCH as it is popularly known, was founded by Lady Eliana Houston-Boswall and her son Alexander Houston-Boswall, after splitting from her husband Sir Alford Houstoun-Boswall in 1996; together they had previously founded The Harrodian School in 1993. Hampton Court House School opened its doors in September 2001 after extensive refurbishments.

The Sixth Form, led by former Westminster School headmaster Tristram Jones-Parry, opened in September 2015. It was the first school in the UK to start lessons in the afternoon.

The building
The Grade II listed building fronts Hampton Court Green and backs on to Bushy Park. It was built around 1757 by George Montagu Dunk, 2nd Earl of Halifax, for the opera singer Mrs Anna Maria Donaldson, and was designed by architect Thomas Wright. In 1771, after the death of the Earl, it was let to the Earl of Suffolk, then to the 4th Earl of Sandwich; Charles Bingham; Admiral Lord Keith; and the 3rd Earl of Kelly. In 1883, Thomas Twining of the Twinings family of tea and coffee merchants bought the house for his daughter and her husband Auguste de Wette. In 1971, the Teddington Theatre Club converted the picture gallery into a theatre.

Notable students

 Austin Dickinson, rock musician
 Ayrton Cable, social activist
 Isabella Blake-Thomas, actress
 Nell Tiger Free, actress

References

External links

 School website
 Sixth Form
 Ofsted page
 Events website

Grade II listed buildings in the London Borough of Richmond upon Thames
Grade II listed houses in London
Grade II* listed parks and gardens in London
Houses completed in 1757
Private co-educational schools in London
Private schools in the London Borough of Richmond upon Thames